Crevedia is a commune in Dâmbovița County, Muntenia, Romania with a population of 6,617 people. It is composed of five villages: Cocani, Crevedia, Dârza, Mănăstirea and Samurcași.

References

Communes in Dâmbovița County
Localities in Muntenia